Alejandro Galindo may refer to:

 Alejandro Galindo (footballer), Guatemalan footballer
 Alejandro Galindo (director), Mexican screenwriter and film director